Aleksandar Kristić (Serbian Cyrillic: Александар Кристић; born 5 October 1970) is a Serbian former international footballer. He won the last edition of the Yugoslav First League in 1992. He also played twice in Serie A for Salernitana, and scored the only goal 30 seconds after entering the game in his debut match, a 4-0 victory against Bologna.

He was capped once for FR Yugoslavia, against Argentina in 1998.

Coaching
After his retirement as a player, he gained experience coaching with OFK Beograd and FK Hajduk Beograd. In 2008, he was appointed as assistant coach to Zdeněk Zeman at Red Star Belgrade, and remained in the position at the club after the Czech's departure. He was the head coach of FK Napredak Kruševac.

Kristić was appointed as the head coach of China League Two club Qingdao Jonoon on 14 June 2018.

References

External links
 https://web.archive.org/web/20090305093740/http://www.zerodic.com/autor/fudbal_1945-1992/igraci/igraci_k.htm
 
 Aleksandar Kristić Stats at Utakmica.rs

1970 births
Living people
Sportspeople from Valjevo
Yugoslav footballers
Serbian footballers
Serbia and Montenegro international footballers
Serbia and Montenegro expatriate footballers
Serbia and Montenegro footballers
FK Bor players
Red Star Belgrade footballers
Degerfors IF players
OFK Beograd players
FK Zemun players
Ethnikos Asteras F.C. players
U.S. Salernitana 1919 players
Yugoslav First League players
Serie A players
Allsvenskan players
Expatriate footballers in Sweden
Expatriate footballers in Greece
Association football defenders
Association football midfielders
Expatriate footballers in Italy
Red Star Belgrade non-playing staff
Red Star Belgrade managers
Serbia and Montenegro expatriate sportspeople in Italy
Serbia and Montenegro expatriate sportspeople in Greece
Serbia and Montenegro expatriate sportspeople in Sweden
Expatriate football managers in China
Serbian football managers